Lepinia taitensis is a species of plant in the family Apocynaceae. It is endemic to French Polynesia and classified as critically endangered by the IUCN.

References

Flora of French Polynesia
taitensis
Critically endangered plants
Taxonomy articles created by Polbot
Taxa named by Joseph Decaisne